Brian Kaltreider (born March 22, 1974) is an American professional stock car racing driver who competes part-time in the ARCA Menards Series and the ARCA Menards Series West, driving the No. 07 Ford for his own team, Mystic Motorsports. He has also driven in the NASCAR Camping World Truck Series in the past.

Racing career

NASCAR Camping World Truck Series
Kaltreider began his NASCAR career in 2018, driving the No. 50 Chevrolet Silverado for Beaver Motorsports at Chicagoland. He finished 25th after starting 30th.

ARCA Menards Series
Kaltreider first started racing in 2001, where he drove the No. 36 Ford for his own team at Charlotte, though failed to finish due to clutch problems. He kept racing on a part-time schedule throughout the years, normally at Pocono. On December 25, 2018, most of Kaltreider's equipment was destroyed in a shop fire. His cars were being updated for the 2019 ARCA Menards Series season (one by GMS Racing) but none of the losses were covered by insurance and only one legacy car was left.

On the 2022 Lucas Oil 200 entry list, it was revealed that Kaltreider would return after 3 years away from ARCA, for the first time since the 2018 shop fire mishap. It appeared that he and the team would attempt the full season as they attempted the first three races. However, at Talladega, the team suffered an engine failure and without a new engine, they have not been able to attempt any races since then.

ARCA Menards Series West
Kaltreider made his West Series debut in the 2022 General Tire 150, which was a combination race between the main ARCA Series and the West Series.

Motorsports career results

NASCAR
(key) (Bold – Pole position awarded by qualifying time. Italics – Pole position earned by points standings or practice time. * – Most laps led.)

Camping World Truck Series

ARCA Menards Series
(key) (Bold – Pole position awarded by qualifying time. Italics – Pole position earned by points standings or practice time. * – Most laps led.)

ARCA Menards Series West
(key) (Bold – Pole position awarded by qualifying time. Italics – Pole position earned by points standings or practice time. * – Most laps led.)

References

External links
 

Living people
1974 births
NASCAR drivers
Racing drivers from Pennsylvania
ARCA Menards Series drivers
Sportspeople from Reading, Pennsylvania